Henry Edward Autrey (born March 18, 1952) is a United States district judge of the United States District Court for the Eastern District of Missouri.

Education and career

Born in Mobile, Alabama, Autrey received a Bachelor of Arts degree from Saint Louis University in 1974 and a Juris Doctor from Saint Louis University School of Law in 1977. He was an assistant circuit attorney for the City of St. Louis, Missouri from 1977 to 1984, and then first assistant circuit attorney in that office from 1984 to 1986. In 1986, he became an Associate Circuit judge for the Twenty-second Judicial Circuit Court of the City of St. Louis, until 1997 when he became a Circuit judge, a position he held until 2002.

District court service

On March 21, 2002, Autrey was nominated by President George W. Bush to a seat on the United States District Court for the Eastern District of Missouri, vacated by George F. Gunn. Autrey was confirmed by the United States Senate on August 1, 2002, and received his commission the following day.

See also 
 List of African-American federal judges
 List of African-American jurists

Sources

1952 births
Living people
Missouri state court judges
Judges of the United States District Court for the Eastern District of Missouri
United States district court judges appointed by George W. Bush
21st-century American judges
African-American judges
Lawyers from Mobile, Alabama
Saint Louis University School of Law alumni
Saint Louis University alumni
20th-century American lawyers